Agnes of Quedlinburg may refer to:

Agnes I, Abbess of Quedlinburg (ca. 1090–1125)
Agnes II, Abbess of Quedlinburg (Agnes of Meissen; 1139–1203)